Tabish Hussain (born 6 June 2001) is a footballer who plays as a winger for Albion Sports. Born in England, he represents the Pakistan national team.

Club career
Born in Bradford, Hussain spent time with the youth teams of both Eccleshill United and Guiseley, before making his senior debut for Guiseley in the 2018–19 season. On 21 September 2019 Hussain joined Yorkshire Amateur on loan until 9 October 2019. Five days after returning to Guiseley, Hussain was loaned out to his former youth club, Eccleshill United.

In September 2020 he moved to Bradford (Park Avenue). He signed for Ossett United in May 2021.

He moved to Albion Sports in June 2022.

International career
In May 2019 he was called up by the Pakistan national team for a training camp. He made his national team debut on 6 June 2019 in a 2022 FIFA World Cup qualifier against Cambodia, as an 84th-minute substitute for Muhammad Ali.

References

2001 births
Living people
Footballers from Bradford
English footballers
English people of Pakistani descent
Pakistani footballers
Pakistan international footballers
Eccleshill United F.C. players
Guiseley A.F.C. players
Yorkshire Amateur A.F.C. players
Bradford (Park Avenue) A.F.C. players
Ossett United F.C. players
Albion Sports A.F.C. players
National League (English football) players
Northern Premier League players
Association football wingers